Morris Belzberg (b. September 25, 1929 - d. May 2, 2020) was a Canadian born businessman, who lived in the  United States since approximately 1966.  He was the former owner of the Pittsburgh Penguins of the National Hockey League. He won the Stanley Cup with the team in 1992.

Background
Belzberg was the Chairman of Budget Rent A Car Corp from approximately 1968 to 1989.  In 1965, he became Budget's first franchisee in Canada, before joining Budget's Canadian operation.  In 1969, he moved to Chicago.

After leaving Budget in 1989, Belzberg acquired a piece of the Minnesota North Stars. In 1991, he acquired 50 percent of the Pittsburgh Penguins. He sold his interest in the Penguins in 1997.

Personal
Belzberg had a winter home in Palm Springs, California.

Belzberg's wife, Cynthia Belzberg, died on December 31, 2004.

References

1929 births
2020 deaths
Canadian Jews
Minnesota North Stars executives
National Hockey League executives
National Hockey League owners
Pittsburgh Penguins owners
Ice hockey people from Calgary
Stanley Cup champions